Exothea is a genus of flowering plants belonging to the family Sapindaceae.

Its native range is Southern Florida to Central America, Caribbean.

Species:

Exothea copalillo 
Exothea diphylla 
Exothea paniculata

References

Sapindaceae
Sapindaceae genera